The Australian Touring Car Championship (ATCC) is a touring car racing award held in Australia since 1960. The series itself is no longer contested, but the title lives on, with the winner of the Repco Supercars Championship awarded the trophy and title of Australian Touring Car Champion.

History

The first Australian Touring Car Championship was held in 1960 as a single race for Appendix J Touring Cars. This was reflected the rising popularity of races held for passenger sedans; as opposed to those for purpose built open wheel racing cars, or sports cars. The race was held at the Gnoo Blas Motor Racing Circuit in Orange in rural New South Wales, west of Sydney. It was won by journalist racer, David McKay driving a Jaguar 3.4 Litre prepared by his own racing team, which to this point had been better known for preparing open-wheel and sports racing cars.

The early years of the ATCC saw the annual event held mostly at rural circuits, before finally visiting a major city circuit, Lakeside Raceway on the outskirts of Brisbane in 1964. This race was also the first not won by a Jaguar with Ian Geoghegan driving a Ford Cortina GT to win the first of his five titles. From 1965 the title would largely be won by an American V8 powered muscle car, most notably the Ford Mustang which would be used to win five consecutive titles in 1965 to 1969 with (Norm Beechey) and Geoghegan. The first championship victory by the driver of an Australian car was that of Beechey in 1970 driving a Holden HT Monaro GTS350. As of 4 December 2011 Beechey and Jamie Whincup are the only two people to have won the championship in both a Ford and a Holden. The 1971 and 1972 championships were won by 1962 and 1963 champion Bob Jane who drove a 7.0 litre Chevrolet Camaro ZL-1 in 1971 before CAMS rule changes forced Jane to use the smaller 5.7 litres 350 Chevrolet in the Camaro in 1972.

A major shift occurred in 1973. The championship had grown from a single race into a multi-event series in 1969, but the competition had not changed markedly. The 'Supercar scare' that had rocked the buildup to 1972 Bathurst 500 forced sweeping changes through touring car regulations. The Improved Touring Car regulations which governed the ATCC, known at the time as Group C were amalgamated with the more basic Group E Series Production Touring Cars regulations which governed the Bathurst touring car endurance race in a compromise between the two, creating a single class for touring car racing that would hold sway of Australian Touring Car racing until the introduction of Group A in 1985.

This period saw a rise in the tribal style conflicts between Holden and Ford and in particular the two marques leading drivers, respectively Peter Brock and Allan Moffat who between them would claim seven of the eras 12 championships (and nine of the associated Bathurst victories). By the mid-1980s Group C had become wracked with infighting and almost random parity adjustments between competing marques.

Attention focussed purely on Holden and Ford had blurred as European and Japanese manufacturers joined the Australian agents of the two big American companies, the trend starting in 1981 with BMW, Mazda and Nissan. The international Group A regulations that already utilised by European and Japanese touring car series came into full effect in Australia from 1985 and allowed the international manufacturers to compete on equal terms. Holden was forced briefly into catchup phase and all but backed out of the sport in 1992 after Group A had been dominated by more track-focused production cars such as the turbocharged Ford Sierra RS500 and various Nissan Skylines, as well as the BMW M3.

By the mid-1980s, a number of the leading teams including the Holden Dealer Team, Dick Johnson Racing, JPS Team BMW and the Peter Jackson Nissan team had begun to make a lot of noise about the very little amount of prize money on offer for their efforts in crisscrossing the country in pursuit of the title. In 1984, the final year of the Group C rules, it was estimated that the Brisbane based Johnson team had covered some 20,000 km in travelling to and from championship meetings, often for as little as AU$1,500 for a win. When CAMS increased the title to 10 rounds in 1986, with little change to the prize money, the teams were threatening that the ATCC would see smaller and smaller grids unless CAMS found a series sponsor. The sponsor that was found was oil giant Shell who put up some $275,000 worth of prize money from the 1987 ATCC, ensuring the long-term future of the series.

1992 saw the unhappy demise of Group A and with the international touring car scene fragmenting in several directions (moving towards DTM, Super Touring and Super GT) Australia forged its own path evolving the Group A specification Holden Commodores and re-introducing the Ford Falcon into the new Group 3A regulations that would later be renamed as V8 Supercar.

The ATCC continued to be used until the end of the 1998 season, after which V8 Supercar organisers altered the name of the series, eventually adopting its present identity, the Supercars Championship.

ATCC champions and records

Accurate to the 2015 Coates Hire Sydney 500. Current full-time drivers are highlighted in bold text.

Event starts by driver

Race wins by driver

Pole positions by driver

Championship wins by driver

Championship wins by manufacturer

See also
V8 Supercars
List of Australian Touring Car and V8 Supercar champions
List of Australian Touring Car Championship races

 
Recurring sporting events established in 1960
1960 establishments in Australia
Sports leagues established in 1960